Arjunpur is a village in Debipur Sarai Gram panchayat in Bilhaur Tehsil, Kanpur Nagar district, Uttar Pradesh, India. Agriculture is the main profession of the villagers.

As per 2011 Census of India report the population of the village is 590 where 318 are men and 272 are women.

References

Villages in Kanpur Nagar district